Jordan Alexander Goldwire (born June 18, 1999) is an American professional basketball player for Mornar of the ABA League and the Montenegrin League. He played college basketball for the Oklahoma Sooners of the Big 12 Conference. He also played for the Duke Blue Devils.

High school career
Goldwire played in high school for Norcross High School in Norcross, Georgia. Goldwire played on a talented high school team consisting of Rayshaun Hammonds (Georgia), Lance Thomas (Louisville/Memphis), JoJo Toppin (Georgia/Georgia State), Kyle Sturdivant (USC/Georgia Tech) and Brandon Boston Jr. (Kentucky). Norcross was 26–4 his junior year and 26–6 his senior year losing in the State Championship Game in front a crowd of over 10,000 people at McCamish Pavilion, the arena of Georgia Tech. As a senior, he averaged 12.8 points, 8.3 assists, 2.1 steals per game and was named All Region, All Gwinnett County and All State.

Recruiting
By the end of his high school career, he was a consensus three-star recruit.

On May 1, 2017, he committed to play college basketball for Duke.

College career 
Goldwire primarily served in a bench role during his first two seasons. By December 2019, his minutes increased with an injury to starting point guard Tre Jones.  As a junior, Goldwire started 15 games and averaged 4.7 points, 2.5 rebounds, 2.3 assists, and 1.5 steals per game while shooting 48.7 percent from the floor and 35.4 percent from 3-point range. He posted a season-high 13 points in a win over then-eighth-ranked Florida State. 

As a senior, Goldwire averaged 5.8 points, four assists and 2.9 rebounds per game, earning Atlantic Coast Conference (ACC) All-Defensive Team honors. He led the ACC in assist-to-turnover ratio while finishing second in the ACC in steals and seventh in assists. He posted 2+ steals in 19 straight games and became only the third Duke Guard under Coach K to average more than two steals per game for a season. Goldwire graduated with a Degree in Sociology on May 2, 2021.

With covid allowing for a fifth year of collegiate eligibility, Goldwire decided to pursue a Masters Degree, transfering to the University of Oklahoma under new coach Porter Moser. At Oklahoma he started 35 games and averaged 10.4 Points, 3.6 Assists, 3.6 Steals, and 2.6 Rebounds and was All-Big 12 Honorable Mention. 

During his collegiate career, Goldwire had seasons in which he was ranked in the Top 10 in Steals and Assists in both the ACC and the Big 12.

Professional career

Austin Spurs (2022)
On October 24, 2022, Goldwire joined the Austin Spurs training camp roster. On December 22, 2022, Goldwire was waived.

Mornar Bar (2023–present)
On January 21, 2023, he signed with Mornar of the Montenegrin League.

Career statistics

College

|-
| style="text-align:left;"| 2017–18
| style="text-align:left;"| Duke
| 26 || 0 || 6.5 || .321 || .263 || .750 || .5 || .9 || .3 || .0 || 1.0
|-
| style="text-align:left;"| 2018–19
| style="text-align:left;"| Duke
| 35 || 0 || 8.6 || .273 || .120 || .500 || .8 || .7 || .6 || .0 || .9
|-
| style="text-align:left;"| 2019–20
| style="text-align:left;"| Duke
| 31 || 15 || 24.1 || .487 || .354 || .636 || 2.5 || 2.3 || 1.5 || .2 || 4.7
|-
| style="text-align:left;"| 2020–21
| style="text-align:left;"| Duke
| 24 || 12 || 28.5 || .379 || .333 || .737 || 2.9 || 4.0 || 2.2 || .1 || 5.8
|- class="sortbottom"
| style="text-align:center;" colspan="2"| Career
| 116 || 27 || 16.4 || .399 || .295 || .667 || 1.6 || 1.8 || 1.1 || .1 || 2.9

References

External links
Oklahoma Sooners bio
Duke Blue Devils bio

1999 births
Living people
American men's basketball players
Austin Spurs players
Basketball players from Georgia (U.S. state)
Duke Blue Devils men's basketball players
Norcross High School alumni
Oklahoma Sooners men's basketball players
People from Lawrenceville, Georgia
Point guards